The women's 100 metres hurdles at the 2022 World Athletics U20 Championships was held at the Estadio Olímpico Pascual Guerrero on 4–6 August 2022.

53 athletes from 33 countries were entered to the competition.

Records
U20 standing records prior to the 2022 World Athletics U20 Championships were as follows:

Results

Round 1
Qualification: First 3 of each heat (Q) and the 6 fastest times (q) qualified for the semifinals.

Semifinals
The semi-final took place on 5 August, with the 24 athletes involved being splitted into 3 heats of 8 athletes each. The first 2 athletes in each heat ( Q ) and the next 2 fastest ( q ) qualified to the final. The overall results were as follows:

Wind:Heat 1: +0.2 m/s, Heat 2: 0.0 m/s, Heat 3: +0.4 m/s

Final
The final started at 15:42 on 6 August. The results were as follows:

References

100 metres hurdles
Sprint hurdles at the World Athletics U20 Championships